Converse is an unincorporated community in Clinton County, in the U.S. state of Missouri.

History
Converse was laid out in 1870 when the railroad was extended to that point, and named for a railroad worker. A post office was established at Converse in 1870, and remained in operation until 1951.

References

Unincorporated communities in Clinton County, Missouri
Unincorporated communities in Missouri